Le Rêve du Diable (The Devil's Dream) is a Canadian folk music group from Quebec. It is one of the oldest folk music bands in the province, and has been performing folk music for more than forty years.

History
The band was founded by Gervais Lessard and Claude Méthé in 1974. In recent years the band's members include Lessard and Claude "Le Clin" Morin. The band made their first, eponymous album in 1976. They have since then released eight albums, the latest in the fall of 2013.

In May 2012 Le Rêve du Diable received the Quebec Medal of the National Assembly.

A documentary film about Le Rêve du Diable was created by filmmaker Feber E. Coyote in 2013.

The band continues to perform and present workshops about traditional music at festivals.

Discography
1976:  Le Rêve du Diable
1977:  Rivière Jaune
1979:  Délires Et Des Reels
1982:  Auberge le Rêve du Diable
1991:  Avec Cholestérol
1996:  Résurrection
2002:  Sans tambour ni trompette
2013:  Avec tambour et trompette
2016:  Un choix d'enfer, les grands succès

Special guests
2016:  Chansons pour Hank (Feber E. Coyote, Productions Feber)

Filmography
1975: "La veillée des veillées" (André Gladu, National film board of Canada) 
1982: "Crac!" (Frédéric Back, National film board of Canada)
2014: "Le Rêve du Diable: avec tambour et trompette" (Feber E. Coyote, Productions Feber)

See also

List of bands from Canada
Music of Quebec

References

External links
Québec Info Musique
Le Rêve du Diable discography at allmusic

Musical groups established in 1974
Musical groups from Quebec
Canadian folk music groups